TV Fama is a weekday Brazilian entertainment newsmagazine on RedeTV! which licenses the format of the American entertainment newsmagazine Entertainment Tonight. The program is presented by Nelson Rubens and Íris Stefanelli.

It is one of the oldest programs on the network. Since joining the air, TV Fama has significant average audience.

History
The program began on the first day of transmission of RedeTV! (November 15, 1999), showing only parties and events. It ended up leaving the air in two weeks.

On July 17, 2000 the program returned to the air with the focus on celebrities using the American ET format, hosted by Monique Evans and Paulo Bonfá.

In 2001, the show started to be presented by Nelson Rubens and Janaína Barbosa. In 2002, Janaína was replaced by Luísa Mell, who co-presented the show with Nelson until 2006.

Íris Stefanelli and Adriana Lessa co-presented the program along with Nelson Rubens from 2007 until 2010. In May 2010, both Lessa and Rubens left the series and Íris Stefanelli became the sole presenter and continued hosting the show. In 2014, Iris Stefanelli returned to command the TV Fama, next to Nelson.Currently, the show is hosted by Nelson and Flávia Noronha, who has presents the show since 2010.Íris Stefanelli now presents another TV show in the same network, called Muito Show.

Regular segments
The program has regular feature segments;

References

External links
 Official website (in Portuguese)

Brazilian television news shows
RedeTV! original programming
2000 Brazilian television series debuts